The Bell-boy Jacket is modeled on uniforms traditionally worn by hotel bell-boys and messengers, consisting of a very fitted waist-length jacket and a band collar, often double-breasted and trimmed with fancy braid or piping, and rows of close-set brass buttons. The cuffs of the jacket often have similar decoration. The style is based on 19th-century military dress uniforms and drummer boys.

Jackets